The Chacarilla Formation is an Oxfordian to Early Cretaceous geologic formation of the Tarapacá Basin in northern Chile, close to the border with Bolivia. The marine and fluvial formation preserves several dinosaur trackways and has been declared a Natural Sanctuary in 2004.

Description 

The lower part of the formation was deposited under marine conditions and the upper part in a meandering river floodplain and point bar environment. Paleocurrent analysis demonstrated a flow direction towards the west, northwest and west-northwest.

The formation contains ichnofossils of theropods and ornithopods, occurring in the Early Cretaceous upper part of the formation, which is marked by an angular unconformity, overlain by volcanic and clastic rocks of the Late Cretaceous to Early Paleocene Cerro Empexa Formation. The top of the formation is not younger than Aptian.

Fossil content 

Fossil stegosaur, sauropod and theropod tracks and fossil flora have been reported from the formation.

The fourteen trackways of the Chacarilla III tracksite consist of 76 individual footprints. Two of the trackways consist of large ornithopod footprints (average footprint length  and average width ). The other ten trackways were made by large theropods (footprint length more than ). Nearly all digit impressions possess claw marks, but they lack clear impressions of digital pads.

Additionally, in the Jurassic part of the formation, fossil flora was reported, containing fossils of Posidonomya, Perisphinctes, Baiera sp., Brachyphyllum sp., Cladophlebis sp., Dictyophyllum sp., Equisetites sp., Nilsonia sp., Pterophyllum sp., Ptilophyllum sp., Taeniopteris sp., and Filicales.

See also 
 List of dinosaur-bearing rock formations
 List of stratigraphic units with ornithischian tracks
 Stegosaur tracks
 Arcabuco Formation, contemporaneous ichnofossil-bearing formation in Colombia
 La Puerta Formation, contemporaneous ichnofossil-bearing formation in Bolivia
 Baños del Flaco Formation, contemporaneous ichnofossil-bearing formation in central Chile

References

Bibliography 
 
   Material was copied from this source, which is available under a Creative Commons Attribution 4.0 International License.

Further reading 
 C. G. Oliver and C.A. Menéndez. 1968. Geología de la Quebrada Juan de Morales, Tarapacá, Chile y su flora Jurásica. Terceras Jornadas Geologicas Argentinas 163-171
 R. J. Dingman and C. Galli O. 1965. Geology and ground-water resources of the Pica area, Tarapacá Province, Chile. United States Geological Survey Bulletin 1189:1-113

Geologic formations of Chile
Lower Cretaceous Series of South America
Jurassic System of South America
Late Jurassic South America
Mesozoic Chile
Aptian Stage
Barremian Stage
Hauterivian Stage
Valanginian Stage
Berriasian Stage
Tithonian Stage
Kimmeridgian Stage
Oxfordian Stage
Sandstone formations
Shale formations
Fluvial deposits
Ichnofossiliferous formations
Fossiliferous stratigraphic units of South America
Paleontology in Chile
Geology of Tarapacá Region
National Monuments of Chile